Seokcheon Sageori Station is a subway station on Line 2 of the Incheon Subway.

External links

  Station information from Incheon Transit Corporation
 Station Map

Metro stations in Incheon
Seoul Metropolitan Subway stations
Railway stations opened in 2016
Namdong District
Incheon Subway Line 2